Florent Perraud (born 11 June 1982) is a French professional footballer.

Perraud played at the professional level in Ligue 2 for Dijon FCO, Libourne and Sedan.

External links
 
 

1982 births
Living people
People from Rillieux-la-Pape
French footballers
Association football goalkeepers
Ligue 2 players
Valenciennes FC players
Dijon FCO players
FC Libourne players
FC Gueugnon players
SR Colmar players
CS Sedan Ardennes players
Sportspeople from Lyon Metropolis
Footballers from Auvergne-Rhône-Alpes